The 3rd Stinkers Bad Movie Awards were released by the Hastings Bad Cinema Society in 1981 to honour the worst films the film industry had to offer in 1980. The ballot was later revisited and the expanded version was released in 2006. Listed as follows are the original ballot's picks for Worst Picture and its dishonourable mentions, which are films that were considered for Worst Picture but ultimately failed to make the final ballot (24 total), and all nominees included in the expanded ballot. All winners are highlighted.

Original Ballot

Worst Picture

Dishonourable Mentions 

 Attack of the Killer Tomatoes (NAI)
 The Blue Lagoon (Columbia)
 Caligula (Analysis Film)
 Cruising (UA)
 First Family (Warner Bros.)
 Flash Gordon (Universal)
 Friday the 13th (Paramount)
 The Gong Show Movie (Universal)
 Herbie Goes Bananas (Disney)
 The Hunter (Paramount)
 The Jazz Singer (AFD)
 Night Games (AVCO)
 The Nude Bomb (Universal)
 Oh, God! Book II (Warner Bros.)
 Oh! Heavenly Dog (Fox)
 Raise the Titanic (AFD)
 Saturn 3 (AFD)
 Simon (Warner Bros.)
 Smokey and the Bandit II (Universal)
 Times Square (AFD)
 Up the Academy (Warner Bros.)
 When Time Ran Out... (Warner Bros.)
 Where the Buffalo Roam (Universal)
 Xanadu (Universal)

Expanded Ballot

References

Stinkers Bad Movie Awards